Sørøysund is a former municipality in Finnmark county, Norway.  The  municipality existed from 1852 until its dissolution in 1992.  It is located in the present-day municipality of Hammerfest.  The former municipality encompassed the eastern part of the island of Sørøya, the northern part of the island of Seiland, and the northern part of Kvaløya (with the exception of the town of Hammerfest).  The administrative centre of Sørøysund was the town of Hammerfest, even though the town was not part of Sørøysund.

History

The municipality of Hammerfest landdistrikt ("the rural district of Hammerfest") was established on 1 January 1852 when it was separated from the town of Hammerfest.  The initial population of Sørøysund was 1,256.  On 1 July 1869, the southern district of Kvalsund (population: 514) was separated from Hammerfest landdistrikt to form a municipality of its own, leaving Hammerfest landdistrikt with 932 inhabitants.  On 1 January 1875, a small part of Hammerfest landdistrikt (population: 20) was transferred to the neighboring town-municipality of Hammerfest.

On 1 January 1919, the name of the municipality was changed from Hammerfest landdistrikt to Sørøysund.  On 1 January 1963, another small area of Sørøysund (population: 33) was transferred to the town of Hammerfest.  On 1 January 1992, Sørøysund was merged into the neighbouring town-municipality of Hammerfest.  Prior to the merger, Sørøysund had 2,341 inhabitants.

Name
The name of the municipality was taken from the local Sørøysundet sound between the islands of Sørøya, Stjernøya, and Kvaløya.

Coat of arms
The coat of arms was granted on 8 June 1979. The official blazon is "Azure, three boats argent two and one". This means the arms have a blue field (background) and the charge is three boats; two smaller ones over one larger one. The boats have a tincture of argent which means they are commonly colored white, but if it is made out of metal, then silver is used. The boats were chosen to show the importance of fishing in Sørøysund. The number three also refers to the three islands in the municipality: Sørøya, Kvaløya, and Seiland. The arms were designed by Arvid Sveen.

Government

Municipal council
The municipal council  of Sørøysund was made up of 17 representatives that were elected to four year terms.  The party breakdown of the final municipal council was as follows:

See also
List of former municipalities of Norway

References

External links

Weather information for Sørøysund 

Hammerfest
Former municipalities of Norway
1852 establishments in Norway
1992 disestablishments in Norway
Populated places established in 1852
Populated places disestablished in 1992